Zayandeh Rud is a city in Isfahan Province, Iran.

Zayandeh Rud may also refer to:
 Zayanderud, a river of Iran
 Zayandeh Rud, Kerman, a village in Golbaf District, Kerman County, Kerman province, Iran
 Zayandehrud District, a district in Chaharmahal and Bakhtiari province, Iran
 Zayandeh Rud-e Jonubi Rural District, a rural district in Chaharmahal and Bakhtiari province, Iran
 Zayandeh Rud-e Shomali Rural District, a rural district in Isfahan province, Iran

See also
 Zayandeh Rud Cultural and Recreational Village, Isfahan province
 Zayandeh Rud Dam Complex, Isfahan province